Rafael Nadal defeated the defending champion Roger Federer in a rematch of the previous year's final, 7–5, 6–7(3–7), 6–3 to win the singles tennis title at the 2008 Hamburg European Open.

This was the last edition of the tournament played as an ATP Masters Series event, as it was downgraded to an ATP Tour 500 event for the 2009 season.

Seeds
The top eight seeds receive a bye into the second round.

Draw

Finals

Top half

Section 1

Section 2

Bottom half

Section 3

Section 4

Qualifying

Qualifying seeds

Qualifiers

Lucky losers

Qualifying draw

First qualifier

Second qualifier

Third qualifier

Fourth qualifier

Fifth qualifier

Sixth qualifier

Seventh qualifier

References

External links
Draw
Qualifying draw
ITF tournament profile

Singles